Harry R. Harr (February 22, 1921 – June 5, 1945) was a United States Army soldier and a recipient of the United States military's highest decoration—the Medal of Honor—for his actions in World War II.

Biography
Harr joined the Army from East Freedom, Pennsylvania in November 1942, and by June 5, 1945, was a corporal in Company D, 124th Infantry Regiment, 31st Infantry Division. On that day, near Maglamin, Mindanao, the Philippines, he smothered the blast of a Japanese-thrown hand grenade with his body, sacrificing himself to protect those around him. For this action, he was posthumously awarded the Medal of Honor on March 28, 1946.

Harr, age 24 at his death, was buried in Alto Reste Burial Park, Altoona, Pennsylvania.

Medal of Honor citation
Corporal Harr's official Medal of Honor citation reads:
He displayed conspicuous gallantry and intrepidity. In a fierce counterattack, the Japanese closed in on his machinegun emplacement, hurling hand grenades, 1 of which exploded under the gun, putting it out of action and wounding 2 of the crew. While the remaining gunners were desperately attempting to repair their weapon another grenade landed squarely in the emplacement. Quickly realizing he could not safely throw the unexploded missile from the crowded position, Cpl. Harr unhesitatingly covered it with his body to smother the blast. His supremely courageous act, which cost him his life, saved 4 of his comrades and enabled them to continue their mission.

See also

 List of Medal of Honor recipients
 List of Medal of Honor recipients for World War II
 124th Infantry Regiment (United States)

References

1921 births
1945 deaths
United States Army personnel killed in World War II
United States Army Medal of Honor recipients
People from Blair County, Pennsylvania
United States Army soldiers
World War II recipients of the Medal of Honor